Kerimler is a village in Tarsus district of Mersin Province, Turkey. It between Turkish state highway  and Motorway  both lying from west to east in Çukurova (Cilicia of the antiquity). The population of village is 226  as of 2011. Main economic activity is farming. Various vegetables and fruits and especially grapes are the most pronounced crops.

References

Villages in Tarsus District